Peter Lipták (born 7 September 1989), is a semi-retired Slovak football player who currently plays amateur side TJ Sokol Hrabkov.

Early life
He was born in Prešov. Lipták started out playing for hometown team TJ Sokol Hrabkov. He joined the Tatran's youth academy at the age of sixteen.

Club career

1. FC Tatran Prešov
Lipták made his Tatran Prešov first-team debut on 3 April 2010 in a match against DAC Dunajská Streda. His style of play is characterised by clean tackling and hard work.

References

External links
1. FC Tatran Prešov profile 

1989 births
Living people
Slovak footballers
Sportspeople from Prešov
Association football midfielders
1. FC Tatran Prešov players
MFK Vranov nad Topľou players
FK Dukla Banská Bystrica players
FK Slovan Duslo Šaľa players
MFK Skalica players
Partizán Bardejov players
FK Železiarne Podbrezová players
Slovak Super Liga players
2. Liga (Slovakia) players